Little World is a 2013 Catalan documentary film about Albert Casals, a young man who has been in a wheelchair since suffering leukemia at the age of five. But this has not stopped him from pursuing his dream: to travel around the world, and to do it his way: without money, without companions, without luggage. He sets off from home armed with nothing but his imagination and his courage.

Little World takes us along on his greatest challenge yet: to reach the exact opposite side of the planet. Is it possible to cross the earth in these conditions? Mixing home video techniques and traditional documentary methods, we get to know this young man, his love story, his philosophy of life and his parents' approach to raising him. We will see how Albert and his girlfriend, Anna, go from Barcelona to a remote lighthouse in New Zealand, or how they fail in the attempt. The journey (and the film) can be considered sheer madness, an endearing romance or an epic adventure, or perhaps a little of everything.

The director of the film is Marcel Barrena and is produced by Umbilical Produccions with TV3, TVE, ICAA, ICEC, and Corte y Confección de Películas.

Awards and reviews 
Little World has won on IDFA from Amsterdam (DOC U Award), one of the most prestigious documentary festival, where also got the third place on the audience award among 300 films participating. Little World has invited to the Palm Springs Fest from L.A. for three private screenings out of competition and, at the moment, has been selected in 17 international film festivals.
Best Documentary: Boulder Film Festival (USA)
IDFA 2012: DocU Award; 3rd Audience Award.
Norwegian Doc Film Festival: Audience Award.
Palm Springs International Film Festival (out of competition).
Bradford Film Festival.
ZagrebDox (Croatia): Young Jury Award.
Fic-Cat, Official Selection.
Shanghai International Film Festival- Panorama.
Gdansk DokFilm Festival: official Selection.

One of "the best 10 movies of the year" by Neil Young (Jugsaw, The Hollywood Reporter).

Cast 
Albert Casals, Àlex Casals, Jordi Socías, Alba Casals, Gabriel Vilanova, Jennifer Vallejo, Anna Socías, Mont Serradó, Pilar Alamán, Pepita Moliné, Melanie Gordo, Anaïs Galván y la participación especial de Rarawa Kohere.

References

External links 
 Official Site
 

Spanish documentary films
2012 films
Catalan-language films
2010s Spanish-language films
2012 documentary films
Documentary films about children with disability
Documentary films about cancer
2010s English-language films